Yastıktepe can refer to:

 Yastıktepe, Kemah
 Yastıktepe, Pasinler